Park Square Tower was a 666-metre (2,185 foot) supertall skyscraper that was approved for construction in Dubai, United Arab Emirates. It was supposed to be located in the district of Park Square. When it was originally stated to be completed in 2010 it would have 150 floors and would have been the tallest hotel in the world, overtaking the Burj Al Arab in the same city. The total cost of the project was expected to be $1.97 billion. The architect of the building was Artec Consultants.

According to SkyscraperPage, the project apparently has been canceled.

References

Unbuilt buildings and structures in Dubai